Daniel Hernández may refer to:

People

Artists and musicians
Daniel Hernández Morillo (1856–1932), Peruvian painter for whom the district in Peru is named
Daniel Hernández (born 1990), Mexican drummer for Tangerine Circus
Daniel Hernandez (born 1996), American rapper better known as 6ix9ine

Politicians
Daniel Ordóñez Hernández (born 1968), Mexican lawyer and politician
Daniel Hernández Jr. (born 1990), Arizona State Representative and former intern credited for saving Representative Gabrielle Giffords' life

Sportspeople
Daniel Hernández (tennis) (fl. 1930s), Mexican tennis player
Daniel Hernández (footballer, born 1970), Argentine footballer
Daniel Hernández (soccer, born 1976), American soccer defender
Dani Hernández (born 1985), Venezuelan football goalkeeper
Daniel Hernández (footballer, born 1990), Colombian football midfielder
Daniel Hernández (footballer, born 1994), Mexican football midfielder

Places
Daniel Hernández District, one of sixteen districts of the province Tayacaja in Peru

See also
Daniel
Hernández

Hernandez, Daniel